Langue is a municipality in the Valle Department, Honduras.

The town is located near the border of El Salvador and is a regional Hammock making center.  Most of the town is made up of sharecroppers and day laborers. There are usually Mormon missionaries and Peace Corps volunteers in the city. There is a lot of cattle raised on the flat areas of town. The town has suffered greatly from deforestation and drought. The town's technical school "Instituto Tecnico John F. Kennedy" was built by the Peace Corps. The municipality has an official population of over 25,000, most of whom live in the surrounding villages.

The main town has a moderate sized market that expands greatly on Sundays when villagers come to town to sell crops or goods. Also is the town in which population has the best transportation in the south zone of Honduras. There are buses traveling to: Amatillo, Nacaome, Choluteca, Monjaras, Cedeño, Buena vista, Tegucigalpa, El Progreso and so on.

Demographics
At the time of the 2013 Honduras census, Langue municipality had a population of 20,944. Of these, 98.73% were Mestizo, 0.87% White, 0.28% Black or Afro-Honduran, 0.08% Indigenous and 0.04% others.

References

Municipalities of the Valle Department